Nannilam is a panchayat town in Thiruvarur District in the Indian state of Tamil Nadu. It is the headquarters town for Nannilam Taluk.

The town is a main hub for the nearby villages. Many of the population are farmers. Nannilam is located 30 km west of Karaikal and 30 km east of Kumbakonam. 
The people mainly depend on agriculture, almost 70% of the population are employed in agriculture. 

Most of the villages developed along the river banks like saliperi village. 
The Tirumalarajanar River (Thriumalai rajan river, branch of Cauvery) flows in Nannilam taluk.

Demographics
According to the 2001 Indian census, Nannilam then had a population of 9880. Males constitute 50% of the population and females 50%. Nannilam has an average literacy rate of 75%, higher than the national average of 59.5%: male literacy is 81%, and female literacy is 68%. 10% of the population is under 6 years of age.

Politics
Nannilam assembly constituency (SC) is part of Nagapattinam (Lok Sabha constituency).

The Population density (people per km2) of Nannilam assembly constituency is just 60 against India's 393.83 in 2010 (Just 15% of average India's Population density).

Landmarks
Madhuvaneswarar Temple, an old Shiva temple which is located center of the town.

Schools
Vallalar Gurugulam Matric & Higher Secondary School, Nannilam.
Guru Nursery and primary school, Nallamangudi, Nannliam.
Ezhumalaiyan polytechnic at Kollumangudi
Arooran Polytechnic at Sorakudi
Central University of Tamilnadu at Neelakudy (Near kangalancherry), Tiruvarur District
Tamil Nadu ITI at Vandampalai.
Merit Higher Secondary School at Senthamangalam, Tiruvarur District
Sankara Matriculation (CBSE Syllabus) School at Peralam
Government Higher Secondary School and High School at Nannilam, Peralam, Poonthottam, Mudikondan, Srivanjiam
George Higher Secondary School at Vishnupuram, Eravanchery, Nannilam Taluk
Panchayat Union School at Kammangudi, Vadagudi (post), Nannilam Taluk
Panchayat Union Primary School at Moolangudi, Anaikuppam (post), Nannilam Taluk
Maha Jana Sabha govt aided elementary school established by Vadhyaar Somu Iyer, vadhyaar Venugopala ayyar and later succeeded by Sethurama Iyer.
Thangam Nadunilai Palli, Nallamagudi.
Panchayat Union Elementary School, Thirumaignanam-609403.
 Bharathidasan university near EB OFFICE Nannilam

Notable people
This is the native place of Tamil film director Kailasam Balachander, lyricist Piraisoodan, cinematographer R. Madhi and Writer Nakkeeran.

See also
Poongulam

References

Cities and towns in Tiruvarur district
Cities and towns in Nannilam taluk